Transportation in the United States is facilitated by road, air, rail, and waterways.  The vast majority of passenger travel occurs by automobile for shorter distances, and airplane (or railroad, in some regions) for longer distances. In descending order, most cargoes travel by railroad, truck, pipeline, or boat; air shipping is typically used only for perishables and premium express shipments. Transportation is the largest source of greenhouse gas emissions by the United States.

Ownership and jurisdiction
The overwhelming majority of roads in the United States are owned and maintained by state and local governments.  Federally maintained roads are generally found only on federal lands (such as national parks) and at federal facilities (like military bases).  The Interstate Highway System is partly funded by the federal government but owned and maintained by individual state governments.  There are a few private highways in the United States, which use tolls to pay for construction and maintenance.  There are many local private roads, generally serving remote or insular residences.

Passenger and freight rail systems, bus systems, water ferries, and dams may be under either public or private ownership and operation.  Civilian airlines are all privately owned. Most airports are owned and operated by local government authorities, but there are also some private airports.  The Transportation Security Administration has provided security at most major airports since 2001.

The United States Department of Transportation and its divisions provide regulation, supervision, and funding for all aspects of transportation, except for customs, immigration, and security, which are the responsibility of the United States Department of Homeland Security.  Each state has its own Department of Transportation, which builds and maintains state highways, and depending upon the state, may either directly operate or supervise other modes of transportation.

Aviation law is almost entirely a federal matter, while automobile traffic laws are enacted and enforced by state and local authorities (except on federal property and in unorganized territory).  Economic jurisdiction over tidelands is shared between the state and federal governments, while the United States Coast Guard is the primary enforcer of law and security on U.S. waterways.

Mode share

Passenger

Passenger transportation is dominated by a network of over 3.9 million miles of highways which is pervasive and highly developed by global standards. Passenger transportation is dominated by passenger vehicles (including cars, trucks, vans, and motorcycles), which account for 86% of passenger-miles traveled. The remaining 14% was handled by planes, trains, and buses. Public transit use is highly concentrated in large older cities, with only six above 25% and only New York City above 50% of trips on transit. Airlines carry almost all non-commuter intercity traffic, except the Northeast Corridor where Amtrak carries more than all airlines combined.

The world's second largest automobile market, the United States has the highest rate of per-capita vehicle ownership in the world, with 865 vehicles per 1,000 Americans.

Bicycle usage is minimal with the American Community Survey reporting that bicycle commuting had a 0.61% mode share in 2012 (representing 856,000 American workers nationwide).

Cargo

Freight transportation is carried by a variety of networks. The largest percentage of US freight is carried by trucks (60%), followed by pipelines (18%), rail (10%), ship (8%), and air (0.01%). Other modes of transportation, such as parcels and intermodal freight accounted for about 3% of the remainder. Air freight is commonly used only for perishables and premium express shipments. The difference in percentage of rail's share by ton-miles and by weight (10% vs 38%) is accounted for by the extreme efficiency of trains. A single railroad locomotive may pull fifty boxcars full of freight while a truck only pulls one. Trucks surpass trains in the weight category due their greater numbers, while trains surpass trucks in the ton-miles category due to the vast distances they travel carrying large amounts of freight.

Usually cargo, apart from petroleum and other bulk commodities, is imported in containers through seaports, then distributed by road and rail.  The quasi-governmental United States Postal Service has a monopoly on letter delivery (except for express services) but several large private companies such as FedEx and UPS compete in the package and cargo delivery market.

Safety

The U.S. government's National Center for Health Statistics reported 33,736 motor vehicle traffic deaths in 2014. This exceeded the number of firearm deaths, which was 33,599 in 2014.

In 2020 there was % more road fatalities in the US than in the European Union, or % less in the EU than in the US, with nearly 38,680 in the US, and nearly 18,800 in the EU.

History

18th century
In the late 18th century overland transportation was by horse, while water and river transportation was primarily by sailing vessel. The United States population was centered on its Atlantic coast, with all major population centers located on a natural harbor or navigable waterway.  Low population density between these centers resulted in a heavy reliance on coastwise and riverboat shipping. The first government expenditures on highway transportation were funded to speed the delivery of overland mail, such as the Boston Post Road between New York City and Boston. Due to the distances between these population centers and the cost to maintain the roads, many highways in the late 18th century and early 19th century were private turnpikes. Other highways were mainly unimproved and impassable by wagon at least some of the year.  Economic expansion in the late 18th century to early 19th century spurred the building of canals to speed goods to market, of which the most prominently successful example was the Erie Canal.

19th century
In the transportation revolution, 1815–1860, there were numerous competing forms of transportation, and indeed each new improved mode quickly challenged and usually replaced the last favorite. For example, turnpikes stagecoaches and wagon roads quickly gave way to Canals, on which mules or horses hauled passengers and freight. The canals were soon replaced by site-Wheeler riverboats, and then finally by railway locomotives.

Access to water transportation shaped the geography of early settlements and boundaries.  For example, the Erie Canal escalated the boundary dispute called the Toledo War between Ohio and Michigan in the 1830s.  The disputed Erie Triangle was awarded to Pennsylvania, giving that state access to Lake Erie.  Most of West Florida was given to Mississippi and Alabama to guarantee their access to the Gulf of Mexico.

Development of the mid-western and southern states drained by the Mississippi River system (Mississippi, Ohio and Missouri Rivers) was accelerated by the introduction of steamboats on these rivers in the early 19th Century.  These three rivers (among others) also form the borders of several states.  Prior to the introduction of steamboats, transit upstream was impractical because of strong currents on parts of these waterways.  Steamboats provided both passenger and freight transportation until the development of railroads later in the 19th Century gradually reduced their presence.

The rapid expansion of Railroads brought the canal boom to a sudden end, providing a quick, scheduled and year-round mode of transportation that quickly spread to interconnect the states by the mid-19th century.  During the industrialization of the United States after the Civil War, railroads, led by the transcontinental rail system in the 1860s, expanded quickly across the United States to serve industries and the growing cities.  During the late 19th century, railroads often had built redundant routes to a competitor's road or built through sparsely populated regions that generated little traffic. These marginal rail routes survived the pricing pressures of competition, or the lack of revenue generated by low traffic, as long as railroads provided the only efficient economical way to move goods and people across the United States.  In addition to the intercity passenger network running on Class I and II railroads, a large network of interurban (trolley or "street running") rail lines extended out from the cities and interchanged passenger and freight traffic with the railroads and also provided competition.

20th century
The advent of the automobile signaled the end of railroads as the predominant transportation for people and began a new era of mobility in the United States. The early 20th century Lincoln Highway and other auto trails gave way in the 1920s to an early national highway system making the automobile the primary mode of travel for most Americans.  Interurban rail service declined, followed by trolley cars due in part to the advent of motorized buses and the lack of dedicated rights-of-way but also by deliberate efforts to dismantle urban rail infrastructure (see Great American streetcar scandal). The scarcity of industrial materials during World War II slowed the growth of the automobile, briefly reemphasizing much of the nation's declining rail network. In the 1950s, the United States renewed building a network of high-capacity, high-speed highways to link its vast territory. The most important element is the Interstate Highway system, first commissioned in the 1950s by President Dwight D. Eisenhower and modeled after the Italian autostrada and the German Autobahn system.

Postwar
By 1945, nearly every city in America had at least one electric tram company providing intra-city transportation. There were an estimated 36,377 light rail vehicles in operation. Increased automobile ownership cut this number by 1/3 by 1965.

The airline industry began to successfully compete with intercity rail as a result of government investment, which suffered a loss of ridership. As the civil air transportation network of airports and other infrastructure expanded, air travel became more accessible to the general population.  Technological advances ushered in the jet age, which increased airline capacity, while decreasing travel times and the cost of flights.  The costs of flying rapidly decreased intercity rail ridership by the late 1960s to a point where railroads could no longer profitably operate networks of passenger trains. By the early 1970s almost all passenger rail operation and ownership had been transferred to various federal, municipal and state agencies.

Freight railroads continued to decline as motor freight captured a significant portion of the less-than-carload business. This loss of business, when combined with the highly regulated operating environment and constrained pricing power, forced many railroads into receivership and the nationalization of several critical eastern carriers into the Consolidated Rail Corporation (Conrail). Deregulation of the railroads by the Staggers Act in 1980 created a regulatory environment more favorable to the economics of the railroad industry.  In the 1990s, the increase in foreign trade and intermodal container shipping led to a revival of the freight railroads, which have effectively consolidated into two eastern and two western private transportation networks: Union Pacific and BNSF in the west, and CSX and Norfolk Southern in the east.  Canadian National Railway took over the Illinois Central route down the Mississippi River valley.

In 2014, freight transportation establishments serving for-hire transportation and warehousing operations employed nearly 4.6 million workers and comprised 9.5 percent of the Nation's economic activity as measured by GDP. Truck driving is by far the largest freight transportation occupation, with approximately 2.83 million truck drivers. About 57.5 percent of these professional truck drivers operate heavy or Tractor-trailer trucks and 28.2 percent drive light or delivery service trucks.

The Freight Facts and Figures 2015 indicates that the U.S. freight transportation system handled a record amount of freight in 2014. A daily average of approximately 55 million tons of freight valued at $49.3 billion moved across the transportation system in 2014 to meet the needs of the Nation's 122.5 million households, 7.5 million business establishments, and 90,056 Government units.

Wartime expediency encouraged long distance pipeline transport of petroleum and natural gas, which was greatly expanded in the middle 20th century to take over most of the domestic long-haul market.

Road transportation

Infrastructure and private automobile use

In comparison to some parts of the Western world, both the United States and Canada rely more heavily on motorized transit over walking and bicycling with 86% of American workers commuting to work via private vehicle, costing an estimated additional $1500 per year commuting compared to Western European counterparts.  Car ownership is on the decline but still 91% nationally.  Car ownership is universal, except in the largest cities where extensive mass transit and railroad systems have been built, with lowest car ownership rates in New York City (44%), Washington, D.C. (62%), Boston (63%), Philadelphia (67%), San Francisco (69%), and Baltimore (69%).

With the development of the extensive Eisenhower Interstate Highway System in the 1950s, both long-distance trips and daily the commute were mostly by private automobile. This network was designed to exacting federal standards in order to receive federal funding.

The Interstate system joined an existing National Highway System (a designation created for the legacy highway network in 1995), comprising 160,000 miles (256,000 kilometers) of roadway, a fraction of the total mileage of roads.  The Interstate system serves nearly all major U.S. cities, often through the downtown areas (a point which triggered freeway and expressway revolts in the 1960s and 1970s). The distribution of many goods and services involves Interstate highways at some point. Residents of American cities commonly use urban Interstates to travel to their places of work. The vast majority of long-distance travel, whether for vacation or business, is by the national road network; of these trips, about one-third (by the total number of miles driven in the country in 2003) utilize the Interstate system.

In addition to the routes of the Interstate system, there are those of the U.S. highway system, not to be confused with the above-mentioned National Highway System. These networks are further supplemented by State Highways, and the local roads of counties, municipal streets, and federal agencies, such as the Bureau of Indian Affairs. The five inhabited U.S. territories also have their own road networks. State highways are constructed by each state, but frequently maintained by county governments aided by funding from the state, where such counties exist as governing entities (mostly every state except the Northeastern). Counties construct and maintain all remaining roads outside cities, except in private communities. Local, unnumbered roads are often constructed by private contractors to local standards, then maintenance is assumed by the local government.

All federal highways are maintained by state governments, although they receive federal aid to build and maintain freeways signed as part of the 46,000 mile (75,000 km) nationwide Interstate highway network. Changes by state initiative may be made with federal approval. A large number of expressways are actually government or privately operated toll roads in many East Coast and Midwestern states. West Coast freeways are generally free to users ("freeways", no toll charged per use), although since the 1990s there have been some small experiments with toll roads operated by private companies.

After the collapse of the I-35W Mississippi River bridge in Minnesota in August 2007, the backlog of road and bridge maintenance across the country became an issue in transportation funding.  The collapse prompted a tax increase in Minnesota to speed up bridge repairs, and action in other states, such as the Accelerated Bridge Program in Massachusetts, but after some debate no increase in federal funding.  The 2013 I-5 Skagit River Bridge collapse, caused by a collision with an over-height truck, highlighted "fracture critical" bridges in which the failure of only one structural member will lead to complete collapse.  According to the National Bridge Inventory, there are at least 600,000 bridges of 20 feet or more in length in the United States, all subject to deterioration in the absence of preventative maintenance. In December 2008, 72,868 bridges in the United States (12.1%) were categorized as "structurally deficient", representing an estimated $48 billion in repairs.  President Barack Obama proposed $50 billion of spending on road and bridge repair, plus a national infrastructure bank, but Congress did not act on these proposals.  President Donald Trump also failed to get infrastructure funding approved. In 2021, President Joe Biden signed a bipartisan infrastructure bill with about $110 billion for roads and bridges.

As of 2010, seat belt use is mandatory in all states except New Hampshire. Seat belt use is also mandatory in the District of Columbia and the five inhabited U.S. territories.

Intercity bus

Greyhound Lines is the largest intercity bus company in the United States, with routes in all parts of the contiguous U.S. There are also many smaller regional bus companies, many of which use the terminal and booking facilities provided by Greyhound. Intercity bus is, in most cases, the least expensive way to travel long distances in the United States.

Congestion

Traffic congestion, especially at rush hour, is often considered a problem in many of the country's larger cities. A 2009 study claimed that traffic congestion costs the United States almost $87.2 billion. Motorists also waste 4.2 billion hours annually, or one full workweek per traveler. Moreover, it is estimated that drivers are wasting 6.9 billion hours per year or about 42 hours per driver in traffic congestion as a result of aging infrastructure and poor road conditions.

The United States continues to follow a failed method of attempting to resolve congestion by widening roadways. From 1993 to 2017, the nation's largest 100 urbanized areas added 42% more freeway lane milage, despite population growing by only 32%. However, this policy of widening roadways resulted in a 144% increase in congestion, due to the concept of induced demand.

Cargo

The trucking industry (also referred to as the transportation or logistics industry) involves the transport and distribution of commercial and industrial goods using commercial motor vehicles (CMV). In this case, CMVs are most often trucks; usually semi trucks, box trucks, or dump trucks. A truck driver (commonly referred to as a "trucker") is a person who earns a living as the driver of a CMV.

The trucking industry provides an essential service to the American economy by transporting large quantities of raw materials, works in process, and finished goods over land—typically from manufacturing plants to retail distribution centers. Trucks are also important to the construction industry, as dump trucks and portable concrete mixers are necessary to move the large amounts of rocks, dirt, concrete, and other construction material. Trucks in America are responsible for the majority of freight movement over land, and are vital tools in the manufacturing, transportation, and warehousing industries.

Large trucks and buses require a commercial driver's license (CDL) to operate. Obtaining a CDL requires extra education and training dealing with the special knowledge requirements and handling characteristics of such a large vehicle. Drivers of CMVs must adhere to the hours of service, which are regulations governing the driving hours of commercial drivers. These, and all other rules regarding the safety of interstate commercial driving, are issued by the Federal Motor Carrier Safety Administration (FMCSA). The FMCSA is also a division of the United States Department of Transportation (USDOT), which governs all transportation-related industries such as trucking, shipping, railroads, and airlines. Some other issues are handled by another branch of the USDOT, the Federal Highway Administration (FHWA).

Developments in technology, such as computers, satellite communication, and the internet, have contributed to many improvements within the industry. These developments have increased the productivity of company operations, saved the time and effort of drivers, and provided new, more accessible forms of entertainment to men and women who often spend long periods of time away from home. In 2006, the U.S. Environmental Protection Agency implemented revised emission standards for diesel trucks (reducing airborne pollutants emitted by diesel engines) which promises to improve air quality and public health.

Roadway links with adjacent countries and non-contiguous parts of the United States

Within the United States:

Alaska – Yes, via Canada and the Alaska Marine Highway in Washington
Hawaii – No.
American Samoa – No.
Guam – No.
Northern Mariana Islands – No.
Puerto Rico – No.
U.S. Virgin Islands – No.

With adjacent countries:

Canada – Yes.
Mexico – Yes.
Russia – No, but proposed via Bering Strait crossing
Cuba – No. Since the American embargo against Cuba, car ferry service from Florida and New Orleans to Havana ceased in 1962.
Bahamas – No, but ferries travel to the Bahamas

Traffic codes

Each state has its own traffic code, although most of the rules of the road are similar for the purpose of uniformity, given that all states grant reciprocal driving privileges (and penalties) to each other's licensed drivers.

Air transportation

The United States has advanced air transportation infrastructure which utilizes approximately 5,000 paved runways.  In terms of passengers, seventeen of the world's thirty busiest airports in 2004 were in the United States, including the world's busiest, Hartsfield-Jackson Atlanta International Airport. In terms of cargo, in the same year, twelve of the world's thirty busiest airports were in the United States, including the world's busiest, Memphis International Airport.  Private aircraft are also used for medical emergencies, government agencies, large businesses, and individuals, see general aviation.

There is no single national flag airline; passenger airlines in the United States have always been privately owned. There are over 200 domestic passenger and cargo airlines and a number of international carriers. The major international carriers of the United States are Delta Air Lines, American Airlines, and United Airlines. Low-cost carrier Southwest Airlines operates few international routes, but has grown its domestic operations to a size comparable to the major international carriers.  There is currently no government regulation of ticket pricing, although the federal government retains jurisdiction over aircraft safety, pilot training, and accident investigations (through the Federal Aviation Administration and the National Transportation Safety Board).  The Transportation Security Administration provides security at airports.

Rail

Passenger

Passenger trains were the dominant mode of transportation until the mid-twentieth century. The introduction of jet airplanes on major U.S. routes and the completion of the Interstate Highway system accelerated a decline in intercity rail passenger demand during the 1960s, resulting in the sharp curtailment of passenger service by private railroads. This led to the creation of National Railroad Passenger Corporation (branded as Amtrak) by the federal government in 1971 to maintain limited intercity rail passenger service in most parts of the country. Amtrak serves most major cities but, outside of the Northeast, California, and Illinois, often by only a few trains per day. Amtrak does not serve several major destinations, including Las Vegas, Nevada, and Phoenix, Arizona. Frequent service is available in regional corridors between certain major cities, particularly the Northeast Corridor between Washington, D.C., Philadelphia, New York City and Boston, between New York City and Albany, around Chicago, and in parts of California and the Pacific Northwest.

Private intercity rail ended in the United States in 1983 with the discontinuation of the Rio Grande Zephyr, until Brightline started in South Florida in 2018. The state-owned Alaska Railroad is the only other intercity passenger railroad still operating. It has only rail ferry connections with other railroads.

Rapid transit
There are 15 heavy rail rapid transit systems in the United States. The New York City Subway is the largest rapid transit system in the world by number of stations.

Cargo
The United States makes extensive use of its rail system for freight. According to the Association of American Railroads: "U.S. freight railroads are the world's busiest, moving more freight than any rail system in any other country. In fact, U.S. railroads move more than four times as much freight as do all of Western Europe's freight railroads combined."

Nearly all railroad corridors (not including local transit rail systems) are owned by private companies that provide freight service. Amtrak pays these companies for the right to use the tracks for passenger service. There are approximately 150,000 mi (240,000 km) of mainline track in the United States—the world's longest national railroad network. See List of United States railroads

Rail freight has a major national bottleneck in Chicago and the Midwest (about one-third of the nation's freight trains pass through the region), which is the subject of an ongoing $4.6 billion infrastructure improvement project which started in 2003.

Railway links with adjacent countries
Canada – Amtrak connections run daily between New York City and Montreal, Quebec, New York City and Toronto, Ontario, and Seattle and Vancouver, British Columbia. Alaska is currently rail-accessible by train ferry from Bellingham, Washington and narrow gauge railroad from Whitehorse, Yukon Territory to Skagway. A proposed link to the contiguous United States would link Alaska and Canada via the Yukon and British Columbia. The Canadian National Railway system includes the former Illinois Central route from Chicago via Memphis to New Orleans.
Mexico – Several private firms run touristic trains from near El Paso, Texas, through Chihuahua, Chihuahua and the Copper Canyon to El Fuerte, Sinaloa. Such trains also run from Nogales, Sonora, but no U.S. passenger trains run near Nogales, Arizona, on the other side of the border. Another touristic train runs occasional trains between Campo, California, and Tecate, Baja California.

With few exceptions, the rail gauge is standard gauge . The White Pass and Yukon Route from Skagway, Alaska to Whitehorse, Yukon by way of Bennett, British Columbia is  gauge.

Mass transit

The miles traveled by passenger vehicles in the United States fell by 3.6% in 2008, while the number of trips taken on mass transit increased by 4.0%. At least part of the drop in urban driving can be explained by the 4% increase in the use of public transportation.

Most medium-sized cities have some sort of local public transportation, usually a network of fixed bus routes. Among larger cities many of the older cities also have metro rail systems (also known as heavy rail in the United States) and/or extensive light rail systems, while the newer cities found in the Sun Belt either have modest light rail systems or have no intracity rail at all.

Legislation
On June 26, 2008, the House passed the Saving Energy Through Public Transportation Act (H.R. 6052), which gives grants to mass transit authorities to lower fares for commuters pinched at the pump and expand transit services. The bill also:

Requires that all Federal agencies offer their employees transit pass transportation fringe benefits.  Federal agencies within the National Capital Region have successful transit pass benefits programs.
Increases the federal cost-share of grants for construction of additional parking facilities at the end of subway lines from 80 to 100% to cover an increase in the number of people taking mass transit.
Creates a pilot program for vanpool demonstration projects in urban and rural areas.
Increases federal help for local governments to purchase alternative fuel buses, locomotives, and ferries from 90 to 100%.

Water transportation

Water transport is largely used for freight. Fishing and pleasure boats are numerous, and passenger service connects many of the nation's islands and remote coastal areas, crosses lakes, rivers, and harbors, and provides alternative access to Alaska which bypasses Canada. Several major seaports in the United States include New York City on the east coast, New Orleans and Houston on the gulf coast, and Los Angeles on the west coast. The interior of the U.S. also has major shipping channels, via the Great Lakes Waterway, St. Lawrence Seaway and the Mississippi River System. Freight on the Mississippi River system is carried on barges pushed by approximately 8000 "towboats" and largely consists of bulk goods, such as petrochemicals, grain and cement.

Many U.S. ports are served by cruise ships. Popular destinations include the Caribbean, the Mexican Riviera, Hawaii and the Inside Passage to Alaska. Automobile ferries operate in many locations where bridges are impractical and in congested metropolitan areas, including New York City and San Francisco Bay. Ferries also operate in Sounds that have populated areas surrounding it, such as Puget Sound. Washington State Ferries operates the ferries in Puget Sound and has the second largest ferry fleet in the world. Washington State ferries even offer ferries from Anacortes, Washington to Sidney, British Columbia.

Waterways

The United States has  of navigable inland channels (rivers and canals), exclusive of the Great Lakes. Out of this  is used in commerce. About  of the Mississippi River System are presently navigable, although not all is used for commerce.

Ports and harbors

United States ports and harbors include:

Anchorage, Alaska
Baltimore, Maryland
Boston, Massachusetts
Charleston, South Carolina
Chicago, Illinois
Christiansted, U.S. Virgin Islands
Detroit, Michigan
Erie, Pennsylvania
Gulfport, Mississippi
Hampton Roads, Virginia
Honolulu, Hawaii
Houston, Texas

Jacksonville, Florida
Long Beach, California
Los Angeles, California
Miami, Florida
Mobile, Alabama
New Orleans, Louisiana
Newark-New York City
Pago Pago, American Samoa
Philadelphia, Pennsylvania
Pittsburgh, Pennsylvania
Port Canaveral, Florida

Portland, Oregon
Providence, Rhode Island
Oakland, California
Sacramento, California
Saipan, Northern Mariana Islands
San Diego, California
San Juan, Puerto Rico
Savannah, Georgia
Seattle, Washington
Tacoma, Washington
Tampa, Florida
Toledo, Ohio
Valdez, Alaska

Merchant marine

Most U.S. exports and imports are on foreign ships.  The 1920 Jones Act bars foreign ships from trade within the United States, thus creating a domestic "Jones Act fleet".  Deck officers and ship's engineers of U.S.-flagged ships are usually trained at one of the established maritime academies.

Military
The federal military has a dedicated system of bases with runways, aircraft, watercraft, conventional cars and trucks, and armored and special-purpose vehicles.  During times of war, it may commandeer private infrastructure and vehicles as authorized by Congress and the President.

Pipeline statistics
 Petroleum products: 224,620 km
 Natural gas: 548,665 km (2006)

Policy

As the population of the world increases, cities grow in size and population – according to the United Nations, 55% of the world's population live in cities, and by 2050 this number is expected to rise to 68%. Public transportation policy must evolve to meet the changing priorities of the urban world. The institution of policy enforces order in transportation, which is by nature chaotic as people attempt to travel from one place to another as fast as possible. This policy helps to reduce accidents and save lives.

Pedestrian
A key component of a suitable urban environment is support for pedestrian traffic, including people on foot as well as human propelled vehicles like bikes, skateboards, and scooters. Pedestrian policy is implemented at the state level, but consistent across states is the fact that the pedestrian has the right-of-way. If someone on foot is crossing the street, legally or illegally, any vehicular traffic is required to stop—under no circumstance does a driver have a right to hit a pedestrian. The exact details with respect to when a vehicle has to stop differ between the states, some requiring that all vehicles at an intersection yield to a pedestrian, while others requiring only those vehicles perpendicular to the motion of the crossing to stop. California requires all vehicles at an intersection to yield to a pedestrian walking in any direction.

There are also rules for pedestrian conduct. Though they have the right-of-way, pedestrians are not permitted to leave a curb into a crosswalk close enough to a vehicle to “constitute hazard.” Pedestrians must also yield to mass transit like light-rail cars and trains, as these forms of transportation operate on a schedule and are often moving too quickly to yield to a pedestrian. Pedestrians are also not permitted to delay traffic more than necessary while in a crosswalk. When not using a crosswalk, pedestrians must yield their right-of-way to vehicles who are close enough to constitute hazard. One of the issues with this kind of policy is how vague it is. A pedestrian is expected to determine on the fly what “constitutes hazard,” which can create dangerous situations leading to pedestrian injury or even death. As technology continues to advance, embedded technology like sensors and computer chips in vehicles should be able to process data very quickly and thus prevent collisions, as discussed in the Internet section found below.

Complete Street
A complete street is a roadway that is safe for people of any ability or age utilizing any form of transportation. The concept revolves around the fact that streets are communal spaces, so anyone has a right to access them. In order to ensure universal safety, however, policy exists to ensure that these complete streets are maintained and utilized properly.
 Funding policies refer to the process with which state funds are allocated to the creation of pedestrian areas, bike lanes, and street markings.
 Planning policies refer to the process by which a street is expanded to include support for human powered transportation and how * this expansion fits into the urban planning as a whole.
 Engineering and design policies refer to the implementation of a complete street, including how to differentiate between bike lanes and car lanes.
 Maintenance policies refer to the process with which state funds are allocated to street maintenance to ensure that they remain safe places of travel.
 Use policies refer to the proper use of a complete street to allow efficient transportation for all.

Other supporting policies indirectly related to complete streets include parking policies and vehicle restrictions. Complete streets are an important development for urban transportation because they equally support all forms of transportation, enforce safety, and ensure that everyone can navigate the busy city streets to arrive at their destination as fast as possible.

Traffic Flow
In order to ensure that traffic flow is uniformly dispersed across roadways and does not interfere with existing pedestrian and public transportation infrastructure, traffic flow policy is put in place in order to get everyone to their destination in the most efficient way possible. Traffic flow policy includes everything from how spaced out two cars should be on a highway to which cars have priority at stop signs and street lights to the proper use of bus, taxi, and carpool lanes.

Funding

Federal, state, and local tax revenues support upkeep of most roads, which are generally free to drivers. There are also some toll roads and toll bridges.  Most other forms of transportation charge a fee for use as they are not given much, if any, tax support by Congress.

Government funding of transportation exists at many levels. Federal funding for highway, rail, bus, water, air, and other forms of transportation is allocated by Congress for several years at a time.  The current authorization bill is the Safe, Accountable, Flexible, Efficient Transportation Equity Act: A Legacy for Users (SAFETEA-LU), which runs from 2005 to 2009. A Congressionally chartered committee is considering future funding issues.

Though earmarks are often made for specific projects, the allocation of most federal dollars is controlled by metropolitan planning organizations (MPOs) and state governments.  Usually "matching" funds are required from local sources.  All projects have a sponsoring agency that will receive the funding from the various federal and local sources, and be responsible for implementing the project directly or through contracts.  Large projects require a Major Investment Study and both a Draft and a Final Environmental Impact Review. A patchwork of federal laws and accounts govern the allocation of federal transportation dollars, most of which is reserved for capital projects, not operating expenses.  Some roads are federally designated as part of the National Highway System and get preferential funding as a result, but there are few federally maintained roads outside of Washington, D.C., and national parks.

State governments are sovereign entities which use their powers of taxation both to match federal grants, and provide for local transportation needs.  Different states have different systems for dividing responsibility for funding and maintaining road and transit networks between the state department of transportation, counties, municipalities, and other entities.  Typically cities or counties are responsible for local roads, financed with block grants and local property taxes, and the state is responsible for major roads that receive state and federal designations.  Many mass transit agencies are quasi-independent and subsidized branches of a state, county, or city government.

Economic impact
According to the U.S. Department of Transportation (DOT): "Transportation's vital importance to the U.S. economy is underscored by the fact that more than $1 out of every $10 produced in the U.S. gross domestic product is related to transportation activity. This includes all aspects of transportation, including the movement of goods and the purchase of all transportation-related products and services as well as the movement of people". Employment in the transportation and material moving industry accounted for 7.4% of all employment, and was the 5th largest employment group in the United States.

The United States invests 0.6% of its GDP on transportation annually.

Environmental impacts
Two-thirds of U.S. oil consumption is due to the transportation sector. The "Energy Independence and Security Act of 2007" has a significant impact on U.S. Energy Policy. The United States—an important export country for food stocks—will convert 18% of its grain output to ethanol in 2008. Across the United States, 25% of the whole corn crop went to ethanol in 2007. The percentage of corn going to biofuel is expected to go up. In 2006, U.S. Senators introduced the BioFuels Security Act, which would mandate the production of dual-fuel vehicles and the sale of E85 ethanol fuel. In 2016 transportation became the leading source of greenhouse gas emissions (28.5%), exceeding electricity generation (28.4%).

See also

 United States Department of Transportation
 Transportation in Canada
 List of U.S. cities with high transit ridership
 List of countries by vehicles per capita
 American Public Transportation Association
 History of rail transport in the United States
 Plug-in electric vehicles in the United States
 Road signs in the United States
 Timeline of United States railway history
 Transportation safety in the United States
 Timeline of transportation technology

Location-specific

Transportation in Atlanta
Transportation in Boston
Transportation in Buffalo, New York
Transportation in Charlotte, North Carolina
Transportation in Chicago
Transportation in Cincinnati
Transportation in Dallas
Transportation in Los Angeles
Transportation in St. Louis
Transportation in Guam
Transportation in Hampton Roads
Transportation in Houston
Transportation in Indianapolis
Transportation in the Inland Empire
Transportation in Las Vegas
Transportation on Long Island
Transportation in Louisville, Kentucky
Transportation in Memphis, Tennessee
Transportation in metropolitan Detroit
Transportation in Miami
Transportation in New England
Transportation in New York City
Transportation in Norfolk, Virginia
Transportation in Omaha
Transportation in Pittsburgh
Transportation in Portland, Oregon
Transportation in Philadelphia
Transportation in Puerto Rico
Transportation in Richmond, Virginia
Transportation in the Sacramento metropolitan area
Transportation in Salt Lake City
Transportation in San Diego
Transportation in the San Francisco Bay Area
Transportation in Seattle
Transportation in the United States Virgin Islands
Transportation in Washington, D.C.
Transportation in Williamsburg, Virginia

Funding

All modes

Surface Transportation and Uniform Relocation Assistance Act
Intermodal Surface Transportation Efficiency Act
Transportation Equity Act for the 21st Century
Safe, Accountable, Flexible, Efficient Transportation Equity Act: A Legacy for Users
American Recovery and Reinvestment Act of 2009

Mass transportation
 Urban Mass Transportation Act of 1964
 Urban Mass Transportation Act of 1970
 National Mass Transportation Assistance Act
 Project Independence

References

Further reading
 Atack, Jeremy. "Transportation in American Economic History." in Louis P. Cain,  ed., The Oxford Handbook of American Economic History (2018) 2: 23+ Excerpt
 Atack, Jeremy. "Railroads." in Handbook of Cliometrics ed by Diebolt, Claude, and Michael Haupert, (2018): 1-29.
 Atack, Jeremy, et al. "Did railroads induce or follow economic growth?: Urbanization and population growth in the American Midwest, 1850–1860." Social Science History 34.2 (2010): 171–197. online
 Bednarek, Janet R. "Open Sky: The Broad Range of Recent Scholarship in Aviation History." Mobility in History 4.1 (2013): 89–94.
 Belcher, Wyatt Winton. The Economic Rivalry Between St. Louis and Chicago: 1850-1880 (Columbia UP, 1947).
 Cochran, Thomas C. Railroad Leaders, 1845-1890 (Harvard UP, 1953).
 Gordon, Arthur. American Heritage History of Flight (1962)
 Grant, H. Roger. Transportation and the American People (Indiana UP,  2019).
 Herrendorf, Berthold, James A. Schmitz, Jr, and Arilton Teixeira. "The role of transportation in US economic development: 1840–1860." International Economic Review 53.3 (2012): 693–716. Online 
 Hunter, Louis C. Steamboats on the Western rivers: An economic and technological history (1949).
 Kirkland, Edward Chase. Men, cities and transportation: a study in New England history, 1820-1900 (2 vol Harvard UP, 1948).
 Lewis, Tom. Divided highways: Building the interstate highways, transforming American life (Cornell UP, 2013) 
 Pereira, Rui, Alfredo Pereira, and William J. Hausman. "Railroad Infrastructure Investments and Economic Development in the Antebellum United States." Journal Of Economic Development 42.3 (2017). Online 
 Shaw, Ronald E. Canals for a nation: the canal era in the United States, 1790-1860 (UP of Kentucky, 2014).
 Taylor, George Rogers. The Transportation Revolution, 1815-1860  (1951)
 White, John H. Wet Britches and Muddy Boots: A History of Travel in Victorian America (Indiana UP, 2013). xxvi + 512 pp. 
 Wolmar, Christian. The Great Railway Revolution: The Epic Story of the American Railroad (Atlantic Books Ltd, 2012), Popular history.
 Wright, Robert E. "The Pivotal Role of Private Enterprise in America's Transportation Age, 1790-1860." Journal of Private Enterprise 29.2 (2014): 1+. Online

External links
 594 photographs on American business history, including many on transportation of all types; these are pre-1923 and out of copyright.
 U.S. Department of Transportation (DOT)
 Bureau of Transportation Statistics – Part of DOT
 National Transit Database – Statistics on U.S. public transportation systems from the Federal Transit Administration, part of DOT
 American Public Transportation Association
 ocean freight services in usa